The Kanjirapuzha Dam, a masonry earth dam built for providing irrigation to a Cultural Command Area (CCA) of , is located in the Palakkad district in the Indian state of Kerala. The reservoir, which has three islands within it, also has an established commercial fisheries development programme operated by the Fisheries Department.

Construction of the dam, including the irrigation system, was started in 1961 at an initial cost of Rs. 3.65 crores (1954 price level)  which was revised to Rs. 101.19 crores (1970 price level). To complete the irrigation development in the entire command a new scheme titled "Extension, Renovation and Modernisation (ERM) Irrigation Project" under the Accelerated Irrigation Benefit Programme (AIBP) initiated by the Prime Minister of India, was approved by the Planning Commission in the year 2008 for an estimated cost of Rs 30.0 crore, to cover balance CCA of 1,247 hectare.

Geography

The Kanjirapuzhan Dam is located on the Kanjirapuzha River, a tributary of the Thuthapuzha River, which itself joins the Bharatapuzha River, a part of the west-flowing rivers from Tadri to Kanyakumari. The densely-covered green forest area of the catchment is called the "Vettilachola".

It is built near to Agali Hills. Vaakkodan mala is another tourist spot.

Features
Commercial fisheries and development of tourism by constructing a garden around the dam are also part of the project.

Dam

The total quantity of material used in the dam is 6,240 TMC. The design of the dam takes into account the seismic factors relevant to Seismic Zone-III. The construction work of the dam was started in 1961 and completed in 1980.

Reservoir

The reservoir created behind the dam has a gross storage capacity of 70.83 million cubic meter at a Full Reservoir Level (FRL) of EL 97.54 m. The live storage between the FRL and Minimum Draw Down Level (MDDL) of EL 77.42 m is 69.23 million cubic meter. The Dead Storage in the reservoir is 11.32 million cubic meter. The reservoir caused a submergence of one village resulting in the relocation of 44 tribal community families.

Irrigation development
Two main canal systems, one on the left bank and the other on the right bank, draw water from the reservoir.

References

External links

Dams in Kerala
Reservoirs in Kerala
Dams completed in 1995
1995 establishments in Kerala
Palakkad district
20th-century architecture in India